Lefke Sub-district is a sub-district of Lefke District, Northern Cyprus.

References 

Lefke District